Summer's Lease is a British  television drama series which aired in four parts on BBC2 in 1989. It is based on John Mortimer's novel of the same title, adapted by the author. John Gielgud won a Primetime Emmy Award for Outstanding Lead Actor in a Limited Series or Movie for his performance and the soundtrack, composed by Nigel Hess was awarded the Television and Radio Industries Club award for best television theme.

Cast
 Susan Fleetwood as Molly Pargeter (4 episodes)
 John Gielgud as Haverford Downs (4 episodes)
 Michael Pennington as Hugh Pargeter (4 episodes)
 Rosemary Leach as Nancy Leadbetter (4 episodes)
 Caroline Waldron as Henry Pargeter (4 episodes)
 Veronica Lazar as Baronessa Dulcibene (4 episodes)
 Suzanne Hay as Sam Pargeter (4 episodes)
 Samantha Glenn as Jack Pargeter (4 episodes)
 Siria Betti as Giovanna (4 episodes)
 Denis Lill as Ken Corduroy (3 episodes)
 Gabrielle Anwar as Chrissie Kettering (3 episodes)
 Mel Martin as Rosie Fortinbras (2 episodes)
 Frederick Treves as  Nicholas Tapscott (2 episodes)
 Annette Crosbie as Connie Tapscott (2 episodes)
 Feodor Chaliapin Jr. as Prince Tosti-Castelnuovo (2 episodes)
 Graham McGrath as Chrissie's Friend (2 episodes)
 Pupo De Luca as The Messenger (2 episodes)
 Siri Neal as  Chrissie's Friend (2 episodes)
 Leslie Phillips as William Fosdyke (1 episode)
 Jeremy Kemp as Buck Kettering (1 episode)
 Elizabeth Bennett as  Mrs. Marcia Tobias (1 episode)
 Bernice Stegers as  Louise Corduroy (1 episode)
 Carole Mowlam as  Sandra Kettering (1 episode)

Reception
In a 1991 review, John J. O'Connor of The New York Times called the series "more successful as travelogue than drama." O'Connor summarised that despite some excellent performances, the characters "are not terribly interesting."

References

Bibliography
 Jerry Roberts. Encyclopedia of Television Film Directors. Scarecrow Press, 2009.

External links
 

1989 British television series debuts
1989 British television series endings
1980s British drama television series
BBC television dramas
Television shows based on British novels
1980s British television miniseries
Works by John Mortimer
English-language television shows
Primetime Emmy Award-winning television series